Kinkuna is a coastal locality in the Bundaberg Region, Queensland, Australia. In the  Kinkuna had a population of 111 people.

Geography 
The North Coast railway line runs along the western boundary of the locality entering the locality from the south-west (Goodwood / Woodgate), passing through Kinkuna railway station and Gotlow railway station, before exiting to the northwest (Alloway).

Gotlow is a neighbourhood in the north-west of the locality near the Gotlow railway station.

History 
Gotlow takes its name from the Gotlow railway station, which was named on 3 April 1913 by the Queensland Railways Department and is an Aboriginal word meaning koala.

The locality takes its name from the Kinkuna railway station which was named by the Queensland Railways Department on 9 April 1941.  is an Aboriginal word meaning "laughing".

In the  Kinkuna had a population of 111 people.

References 

Bundaberg Region
Coastline of Queensland
Localities in Queensland